

20001–20100 

|-id=002
| 20002 Tillysmith || 1991 EM || Tilly Smith, British girl who, by recognising the signs of a tsunami, saved many lives on the island of Phuket, December 26, 2004 || 
|-id=004
| 20004 Audrey-Lucienne ||  || Audrey-Lucienne Van Landeghem, last visitor at the "Space is For You" Exhibition at the Royal Observatory of Belgium in 2001 || 
|-id=006
| 20006 Albertus Magnus ||  || Albertus Magnus, German theologian, philosopher and naturalist. || 
|-id=007
| 20007 Marybrown || 1991 LR || Mary J. Brown, American amateur astronomer who assisted in organizing the photographic glass plate archive of the 1.2-m Schmidt Oschin Telescope at Palomar Observatory || 
|-id=012
| 20012 Ranke ||  || Leopold von Ranke, a professor of history in Berlin from 1825 to 1871. || 
|-id=016
| 20016 Rietschel ||  || Ernst Friedrich August Rietschel, German sculptor. || 
|-id=017
| 20017 Alixcatherine ||  || Alix Catherine de Saint-Aignan (born 2002) is the eldest daughter of the discoverer || 
|-id=019
| 20019 Yukiotanaka || 1991 VN || Yukio Tanaka, Japanese baseball infielder for the Hokkaido Nippon Ham Fighters || 
|-id=024
| 20024 Mayrémartínez ||  || Mayré Adriana Martínez Blanco, Venezuelan professional singer, winner of the 2006 "Latin American Idol" contest || 
|-id=037
| 20037 Duke ||  || Michael B. Duke, American selenologist areologist and meteoriticist, at one point curator of the lunar samples returned from the Moon, later chief of the Lunar and Planetary Sciences Division of the Johnson Spacecraft Center || 
|-id=038
| 20038 Arasaki ||  || Yoshikuni Arasaki (born 1953) has been chief of the Okinawa Prefecture Ishigaki Youth House since 2017. He is a well-known amateur astronomer and popularizer of astronomy in Ishigaki Island. He enjoys observing and photographing comets, nebulae and star clusters through his telescope. || 
|-id=040
| 20040 Tatsuyamatsuyama ||  || Tatsuya Matsuyama (born 1983) was born in Kochi city, Japan. He teaches at University of Kochi Primary School and works as an instructor at Geisei Observatory. He is dedicated to improving mathematical skills and increasing astronomical knowledge of primary school students. || 
|-id=043
| 20043 Ellenmacarthur || 1993 EM || Dame Ellen Patricia MacArthur, British solo long-distance yachtswoman || 
|-id=044
| 20044 Vitoux ||  || Frédéric Vitoux (born 1944), a French writer and journalist known for his novel Bébert, Le chat de Louis-Ferdinand Céline (1976) || 
|-id=060
| 20060 Johannforster ||  || Johann Reinhold Forster, 18th-century German naturalist, who (with his son Georg) accompanied James Cook on his second Pacific Voyage || 
|-id=070
| 20070 Koichiyuko || 1993 XL || Koichi Takahashi, director of the Hiroshima Chapter of the Young Astronauts Club of Japan since 1998, and his wife Yuko (a medical doctor and a pharmacist, respectively) || 
|-id=073
| 20073 Yumiko ||  || Yumiko Fujii (born 1968) is the wife of the second discoverer || 
|-id=074
| 20074 Laskerschueler ||  || Else Lasker-Schüler (1869–1945), a German-Jewish poet and playwright of the Expressionist movement || 
|-id=080
| 20080 Maeharatorakichi ||  || Torakichi Maehara (1872–1950) was an amateur astronomer and one of the charter members of the Astronomical Society of Japan, which was founded in 1908. He established his own observatory and made many visual and photographic observations, including Halley's comet in 1910. || 
|-id=081
| 20081 Occhialini ||  || Giuseppe Occhialini, Italian physicist. || 
|-id=084
| 20084 Buckmaster ||  || Bill Buckmaster, American anchor of the news magazine program Arizona Illustrated || 
|-id=096
| 20096 Shiraishiakihiko || 1994 TZ || Akihiko Shiraishi (born 1952) is a writer-editor at Asahi Press. He writes frequently about astronomy and space development. || 
|-id=098
| 20098 Shibatagenji ||  || Genji Shibata (born 1940) is a medical doctor, who contributed to public welfare by establishing a hospital and a home for elderly people in Yamaguchi, Japan. || 
|}

20101–20200 

|-id=102
| 20102 Takasago ||  || Takasago, a Japanese port city at the mouth of the Kakogawa River, Hyogo prefecture || 
|-id=103
| 20103 de Vico || 1995 JK || Francesco de Vico (1805–1848), Jesuit priest and astronomer, discoverer of seven comets, and director of the Collegio Romano Observatory || 
|-id=106
| 20106 Morton || 1995 QG || Donald C. Morton, was director of the Anglo-Australian Observatory during 1976–1986 || 
|-id=107
| 20107 Nanyotenmondai ||  || Nanyotenmondai, the Nanyo Citizens' Observatory, in the Sosyou park of Nanyo, Yamagata, Japan || 
|-id=109
| 20109 Alicelandis || 1995 RJ || Alice Landis Tonry, American graduate of Tufts Medical School, realtor, farmer, and mother of the discoverer || 
|-id=115
| 20115 Niheihajime ||  || Hajime Nihei, member of the Nanyo Astronomy Lovers Club || 
|-id=117
| 20117 Tannoakira ||  || Akira Tanno (born 1940) is a historian studying folk customs and scientists in the Edo period of Japan. || 
|-id=120
| 20120 Ryugatake ||  || Ryugatake, a Japanese town in Kumamoto, on the east coast of the beautiful Kamishima Island, Amakusa || 
|-id=135
| 20135 Juels || 1996 JC || Charles W. Juels (1944–2009), amateur astronomer and discoverer of minor planets || 
|-id=136
| 20136 Eisenhart || 1996 NA || Luther Pfahler Eisenhart (1876–1965), a prolific American mathematician and professor || 
|-id=139
| 20139 Marianeschi || 1996 QU || Edmondo Marianeschi (1922–2010) was one of the most important Italian metallurgists. He wrote important books and obtained several international patents on steel manufacturing. An amateur astronomer, he designed, among others, the Montecitorio square sundial in Rome. || 
|-id=140
| 20140 Costitx ||  || Costitx, Spanish town on the island of Majorca || 
|-id=141
| 20141 Markidger ||  || Mark Richard Kidger (born 1960), British-born astrophysicist of the Instituto de Astrofisica de Canarias || 
|-id=151
| 20151 Utsunomiya ||  || Syogo Utsunomiya, farmer and renowned amateur astronomer in Japan || 
|-id=155
| 20155 Utewindolf ||  || Ute Windolf of Prescott, Arizona, is a very dear and generous friend who was particularly helpful and supportive during the long terminal illness of the discoverer's wife || 
|-id=156
| 20156 Herbwindolf ||  || Herbert Windolf of Prescott, Arizona, is a very dear and generous friend who was particularly helpful and supportive during the long terminal illness of the discoverer's wife || 
|-id=164
| 20164 Janzajíc ||  || Jan Zajíc, Czech student who burned himself to death to protest the 1968 occupation of Czechoslovakia † || 
|-id=174
| 20174 Eisenstein ||  || Gotthold Eisenstein (1823–1852), German mathematician || 
|-id=180
| 20180 Annakolény ||  || Anna Kolény took part in the birth of Slovak sovereignty in the nineteenth century. The first session of the Slovak National Council was held in 1848 in her house in Myjava || 
|-id=187
| 20187 Janapittichová ||  || Jana Pittichová, Slovak-born American astronomer  †  || 
|-id=193
| 20193 Yakushima ||  || Yakushima is a small island located to the south of Kagoshima prefecture, Japan. || 
|-id=194
| 20194 Ilarialocantore ||  || Ilaria Locantore (born 1984), an Italian chemist. || 
|-id=195
| 20195 Mariovinci ||  || Mario Vinci (born 1945) is a generous amateur astronomer and a great friend of the Gruppo Astrofili di Montelupo. He always stood out his availability and support during the construction of the "Beppe Forti" observatory. || 
|-id=197
| 20197 Enriques ||  || Federigo Enriques, professor at the universities of Bologna and Rome || 
|-id=200
| 20200 Donbacky || 1997 DW || Don Backy is the artistic name of the Italian singer and composer Aldo Caponi || 
|}

20201–20300 

|-id=204
| 20204 Yuudurunosato ||  || Yuudurunosato is the nickname of Urushiyama, located in the western area of Nanyo city || 
|-id=205
| 20205 Sitanchen ||  || Sitan Chen (born 1995), an ISTS awardee in 2012 || 
|-id=207
| 20207 Dyckovsky ||  || Ari Misha Dyckovsky (born 1993), an ISTS awardee in 2012 || 
|-id=208
| 20208 Philiphe ||  || Philip Cody He (born 1994), an ISTS awardee in 2012 || 
|-id=211
| 20211 Joycegates ||  || Joyce Gates, mentor at the ISTS in 2012 || 
|-id=212
| 20212 Ekbaltouma ||  || Ekbal Touma, mentor at the ISTS in 2012 || 
|-id=213
| 20213 Saurabhsharan ||  || Saurabh Sharan (born 1993), an ISTS awardee in 2012 || 
|-id=214
| 20214 Lorikenny ||  || Lori Kenny, mentor at the ISTS in 2012 || 
|-id=217
| 20217 Kathyclemmer ||  || Kathy Clemmer, mentor at the ISTS in 2012 || 
|-id=218
| 20218 Dukewriter ||  || Duke Writer, mentor at the ISTS in 2012 || 
|-id=219
| 20219 Brianstone ||  || Brian Stone, mentor at the ISTS in 2012 || 
|-id=224
| 20224 Johnrae ||  || John Rae, Scottish explorer || 
|-id=228
| 20228 Jeanmarcmari || 1997 XG || Jean-Marc Mari, French electronics engineer || 
|-id=230
| 20230 Blanchard ||  || Guillaume Blanchard, French optician || 
|-id=234
| 20234 Billgibson ||  || William C. Gibson, the payload manager of the New Horizons Pluto Kuiper Belt mission || 
|-id=237
| 20237 Clavius ||  || Christopher Clavius (1538–1612) was a German mathematician and astronomer. He figured out where to place the leap years in the Gregorian calendar. Pope Gregory XII revised the Julian calendar with the assistance of Clavius. || 
|-id=242
| 20242 Sagot ||  || Robert Sagot, amateur astronomer || 
|-id=243
| 20243 Den Bosch ||  || Den Bosch (s-Hertogenbosch) is the capital of the province of North Brabant in the Netherlands. || 
|-id=246
| 20246 Frappa ||  || Éric Frappa, French amateur astronomer || 
|-id=252
| 20252 Eyjafjallajökull ||  || Eyjafjallajökull, volcano in southern Iceland || 
|-id=254
| 20254 Úpice ||  || Úpice is a small town in northeastern Bohemia || 
|-id=256
| 20256 Adolfneckař ||  || Adolf Neckař, former director of the Ondřejov Observatory || 
|-id=259
| 20259 Alanhoffman ||  || Alan Hoffman, American engineer, a pioneer in infrared detectors || 
|-id=264
| 20264 Chauhan ||  || Neha Chauhan, an ISTS awardee in 2004 || 
|-id=265
| 20265 Yuyinchen ||  || Yuyin Chen, an ISTS awardee in 2004 || 
|-id=266
| 20266 Danielchoi ||  || Daniel Chimin Choi, an ISTS awardee in 2004 || 
|-id=268
| 20268 Racollier ||  || Rachael Theresa Collier, an ISTS awardee in 2004 || 
|-id=270
| 20270 Phildeutsch ||  || Phillip Thomas Deutsch, an ISTS awardee in 2004 || 
|-id=271
| 20271 Allygoldberg ||  || Allyson Molly Goldberg, an ISTS awardee in 2004 || 
|-id=272
| 20272 Duyha ||  || Duy Minh Ha, an ISTS awardee in 2004 || 
|-id=274
| 20274 Halperin ||  || Bruce David Halperin, an ISTS and ISEF awardee in 2004 || 
|-id=278
| 20278 Qileihang ||  || Qilei Hang, an ISTS awardee in 2004 || 
|-id=279
| 20279 Harel ||  || Matan Harel, an ISTS awardee in 2004 || 
|-id=281
| 20281 Kathartman ||  || Katherine Hartman, an ISTS awardee in 2004 || 
|-id=282
| 20282 Hedberg ||  || Herbert Mason Hedberg, an ISTS awardee in 2004 || 
|-id=283
| 20283 Elizaheller ||  || Elizabeth Rose Heller, an ISTS awardee in 2004 || 
|-id=284
| 20284 Andreilevin ||  || Andrei Joseph Levin, an ISTS awardee in 2004 || 
|-id=285
| 20285 Lubin ||  || Amos Benjamin Lubin, an ISTS awardee in 2004 || 
|-id=286
| 20286 Michta ||  || Maria Lynn Michta, an ISTS awardee in 2004 || 
|-id=287
| 20287 Munteanu ||  || Andrei Munteanu, an ISTS awardee in 2004, and US Naval Observatory SEAP intern  || 
|-id=288
| 20288 Nachbaur ||  || Moriah Katherine Nachbaur, an ISTS awardee in 2004 || 
|-id=289
| 20289 Nettimi ||  || Divya Nettimi, an ISTS awardee in 2004 || 
|-id=290
| 20290 Seanraj ||  || Sean Dilip Raj, an ISTS awardee in 2004 || 
|-id=291
| 20291 Raumurthy ||  || Rohini Subhadra Rau-Murthy, an ISTS awardee in 2004 || 
|-id=292
| 20292 Eduardreznik ||  || Eduard Reznik, 2004 Intel Science Talent Search winner † || 
|-id=293
| 20293 Sirichelson ||  || Silas Isaac Richelson, an ISTS awardee in 2004 || 
|-id=296
| 20296 Shayestorm ||  || Shaye Perry Storm, an ISTS awardee in 2004 || 
|-id=298
| 20298 Gordonsu ||  || Gordon L. Su, an ISTS awardee in 2004 || 
|-id=300
| 20300 Arjunsuri ||  || Arjun Anand Suri, an ISTS awardee in 2004 || 
|}

20301–20400 

|-
| 20301 Thakur ||  || Gaurav Subhash Thakur, an ISTS awardee in 2004 || 
|-id=302
| 20302 Kevinwang ||  || Kevin Yibo Wang, an ISTS awardee in 2004 || 
|-id=303
| 20303 Lindwestrick ||  || Linda Brown Westrick, an ISTS awardee in 2004 || 
|-id=304
| 20304 Wolfson ||  || Jayne Frances Wolfson, an ISTS awardee in 2004 || 
|-id=305
| 20305 Feliciayen ||  || Felicia Yuen-Lee Yen, an ISTS awardee in 2004 || 
|-id=306
| 20306 Richarnold ||  || Richard Arnold, mentor at the ISTS in 2004 || 
|-id=307
| 20307 Johnbarnes ||  || John Barnes, mentor at the ISTS in 2004 || 
|-id=309
| 20309 Batalden ||  || John Batalden, mentor at the ISTS in 2004 || 
|-id=311
| 20311 Nancycarter ||  || Nancy Carter, mentor at the ISTS in 2004 || 
|-id=312
| 20312 Danahy ||  || Thomas Danahy, mentor at the ISTS in 2004 || 
|-id=313
| 20313 Fredrikson ||  || Robert Fredrikson, mentor at the ISTS in 2004 || 
|-id=314
| 20314 Johnharrison ||  || John Harrison, English clock designer || 
|-id=316
| 20316 Jerahalpern ||  || Jerald Halpern, mentor at the ISTS in 2004> || 
|-id=317
| 20317 Hendrickson ||  || Gary Hendrickson, mentor at the ISTS in 2004 || 
|-id=321
| 20321 Lightdonovan ||  || Donna Light-Donovan, mentor at the ISTS in 2004 || 
|-id=323
| 20323 Tomlindstom ||  || Tom Lindstom, mentor at the ISTS in 2004 || 
|-id=324
| 20324 Johnmahoney ||  || John Mahoney, mentor at the ISTS in 2004 || 
|-id=325
| 20325 Julianoey ||  || Julian Oey (born 1964), a prolific asteroid photometrist, observing from Australia. He is the principal discoverer of four binary asteroids and co-discoverer of several others, using the photometry technique. He has written or co-authored a number of papers on binary and other asteroids. Name suggested by P. Pravec and A. Harris (Src). || 
|-id=329
| 20329 Manfro ||  || Nina Manfro, mentor at the ISTS in 2004 || 
|-id=330
| 20330 Manwell ||  || Anne Manwell, mentor at the ISTS in 2004 || 
|-id=331
| 20331 Bijemarks ||  || Billie Jean Marks, mentor at the ISTS in 2004 || 
|-id=333
| 20333 Johannhuth ||  || Johann Sigismund Huth, 18th–19th-century Ukrainian astronomer || 
|-id=334
| 20334 Glewitsky ||  || Grigori Vasil'evich Lewitzky, 19th–20th-century Russian founder and first director of the Astronomical Observatory of Kharkov National University, later director of Tartu Observatoorium (Tartu Observatory) || 
|-id=335
| 20335 Charmartell ||  || Charles Martell, mentor at the ISTS in 2004 || 
|-id=336
| 20336 Gretamills ||  || Greta Mills, mentor at the ISTS in 2004 || 
|-id=337
| 20337 Naeve ||  || Larry Naeve, mentor at the ISTS in 2004 || 
|-id=338
| 20338 Elainepappas ||  || Elaine Pappas, mentor at the ISTS in 2004 || 
|-id=339
| 20339 Eileenreed ||  || Eileen Reed, mentor at the ISTS in 2004 || 
|-id=340
| 20340 Susanruder ||  || Susan Ruder, mentor at the ISTS in 2004 || 
|-id=341
| 20341 Alanstack ||  || Alan Stack, mentor at the ISTS in 2004 || 
|-id=342
| 20342 Trinh ||  || Jonathan Trinh, mentor at the ISTS in 2004 || 
|-id=343
| 20343 Vaccariello ||  || Michael Vaccariello, mentor at the ISTS in 2004 || 
|-id=345
| 20345 Davidvito ||  || David Vito, mentor at the ISTS in 2004 || 
|-id=347
| 20347 Wunderlich ||  || Daniel Wunderlich, mentor at the ISTS in 2004 || 
|-id=351
| 20351 Kaborchardt ||  || Kasey Lynn Borchardt, a DCYSC awardee in 2004 || 
|-id=352
| 20352 Pinakibose ||  || Pinaki Bose, a DCYSC awardee in 2004 || 
|-id=354
| 20354 Rebeccachan ||  || Rebecca Ann Chan, a DCYSC awardee in 2004 || 
|-id=355
| 20355 Saraclark ||  || Sara Catherine Clark, a DCYSC awardee in 2004 || 
|-id=357
| 20357 Shireendhir ||  || Shireen Dhir, a DCYSC awardee in 2004 || 
|-id=358
| 20358 Dalem ||  || Henri Dalem, French historian, specialist in data processing, and webmaster of the international Holbach foundation || 
|-id=360
| 20360 Holsapple ||  || Keith A. Holsapple, American professor of engineering at the University of Washington, who has developed scaling laws for asteroid cratering and explored the relationship between asteroidal shape, spin rates and internal strength || 
|-id=361
| 20361 Romanishin ||  || William Romanishin, American professor of astronomy at the University of Oklahoma || 
|-id=362
| 20362 Trilling ||  || David E. Trilling, American assistant astronomer at the University of Arizona || 
|-id=363
| 20363 Komitov ||  || Boris Petrov Komitov, Bulgarian planetary scientist and popularizer || 
|-id=364
| 20364 Zdeněkmiler ||  || Zdeněk Miler, Czech film-maker and illustrator, best known for the character Krtek ("Little Mole") †  || 
|-id=366
| 20366 Bonev ||  || Boncho P. Bonev, American research assistant professor at the Catholic University of America || 
|-id=367
| 20367 Erikagibb ||  || Erika Gibb, American assistant professor in the Department of Physics and Astronomy of the University of Missouri || 
|-id=371
| 20371 Ekladyous ||  || Nicholas Samir Ekladyous, a DCYSC awardee in 2004 || 
|-id=372
| 20372 Juliafanning ||  || Julia Alexine Fanning, a DCYSC awardee in 2004 || 
|-id=373
| 20373 Fullmer ||  || Austin Tracey Fullmer, a DCYSC awardee in 2004 || 
|-id=375
| 20375 Sherrigerten ||  || Sherri Ann Gerten, a DCYSC awardee in 2004 || 
|-id=376
| 20376 Joyhines ||  || Joy Ellen Hines, a DCYSC awardee in 2004 || 
|-id=377
| 20377 Jakubisin ||  || Daniel James Jakubisin, a DCYSC awardee in 2004 || 
|-id=379
| 20379 Christijohns ||  || Christine Elizabeth Johns, a DCYSC awardee in 2004 || 
|-id=392
| 20392 Mikeshepard ||  || Michael Shepard, American geologist, specializing in radar and optical remote sensing of the minor and terrestrial planets || 
|-id=393
| 20393 Kevinlane ||  || Kevin Nelson Lane, a DCYSC awardee in 2004 || 
|-id=394
| 20394 Fatou ||  || Pierre Joseph Louis Fatou (1878–1929) was employed at the observatory of Paris || 
|-id=399
| 20399 Michaelesser || 1998 OO || Michael Lesser, American scientist, specialist in high quantum efficiency CCDs || 
|}

20401–20500 

|-id=403
| 20403 Attenborough ||  || David Attenborough (born 1927), an English naturalist and broadcaster of wildlife documentaries || 
|-id=405
| 20405 Barryburke ||  || Barry Burke, American CCD sensor designer || 
|-id=415
| 20415 Amandalu ||  || Amanda Jane Lu, a DCYSC awardee in 2004 || 
|-id=416
| 20416 Mansour ||  || Philip George Mansour, a DCYSC awardee in 2004 || 
|-id=420
| 20420 Marashwhitman ||  || David I. Marash-Whitman, a DCYSC awardee in 2004 || 
|-id=426
| 20426 Fridlund ||  || Malcolm Fridlund (born 1952) worked at ESA on projects such as Darwin and Corot. || 
|-id=430
| 20430 Stout ||  || Earl Douglas Stout (c. 1895–1985), a music professor at Louisiana State University and a great-grandfather of the second discoverer. || 
|-id=433
| 20433 Prestinenza ||  || Luigi Prestinenza (born 1929) is a very active, appreciated and popular Italian amateur astronomer. || 
|-id=437
| 20437 Selohusa ||  || The South Euclid–Lyndhurst, Ohio, U.S.A. (SELOHUSA) region is in suburban  Cleveland. Euclid bluestone quarries provided building stone for the development of northeast Ohio in the 19th century. NASA astronaut Carl E. Walz and Charles F. Brush, inventor of arc-lamp street lighting, are from the region. || 
|-id=440
| 20440 McClintock ||  || Shannon Noel McClintock, a DCYSC awardee in 2004 || 
|-id=441
| 20441 Elijahmena ||  || Elijah Login Mena, a DCYSC awardee in 2004 || 
|-id=444
| 20444 Mamesser ||  || Mary Anne Messer, a DCYSC awardee in 2004 || 
|-id=450
| 20450 Marymohammed ||  || Maryam Khadijah Mohammed, a DCYSC awardee in 2004 || 
|-id=451
| 20451 Galeotti ||  || Piero Galeotti, Italian astrophysicist || 
|-id=454
| 20454 Pedrajo ||  || Ana Cristina Pedrajo, a DCYSC awardee in 2004 || 
|-id=455
| 20455 Pennell ||  || Jordan William Pennell, a DCYSC awardee in 2004 || 
|-id=460
| 20460 Robwhiteley ||  || Robert J. Whiteley, American astronomer || 
|-id=461
| 20461 Dioretsa ||  || "Asteroid" backwards, due to retrograde orbit (this is the first such numbered asteroid) || 
|-id=465
| 20465 Vervack ||  || Ronald J. Vervack Jr., American planetary scientist of Johns Hopkins University Applied Physics Laboratory || 
|-id=467
| 20467 Hibbitts ||  || Charles A. Hibbitts, American planetary scientist of Johns Hopkins University Applied Physics Laboratory || 
|-id=468
| 20468 Petercook ||  || Peter Edward Cook, 20th-century British satirist, writer and comedian performer || 
|-id=469
| 20469 Dudleymoore ||  || Dudley Moore, 20th-century British musician, actor and comedian || 
|-id=472
| 20472 Mollypettit ||  || Molly Loren Pettit, a DCYSC awardee in 2004 || 
|-id=474
| 20474 Reasoner ||  || Jonathan William Reasoner, a DCYSC awardee in 2004 || 
|-id=476
| 20476 Chanarich ||  || Chana Leora Rich, a DCYSC awardee in 2004 || 
|-id=477
| 20477 Anastroda ||  || Anastasia Nast Roda, a DCYSC awardee in 2004 || 
|-id=478
| 20478 Rutenberg ||  || Michael Lev Rutenberg-Schoenberg, a DCYSC awardee in 2004 || 
|-id=479
| 20479 Celisaucier ||  || Celine Michelle Saucier, a DCYSC awardee in 2004 || 
|-id=480
| 20480 Antonschraut ||  || Anton H. Schraut, a DCYSC awardee in 2004 || 
|-id=481
| 20481 Sharples ||  || David R. Sharples, a DCYSC awardee in 2004 || 
|-id=482
| 20482 Dustinshea ||  || Dustin James Shea, a DCYSC awardee in 2004 || 
|-id=483
| 20483 Sinay ||  || Daniella Sinay, a DCYSC awardee in 2004 || 
|-id=484
| 20484 Janetsong ||  || Janet Song, a DCYSC awardee in 2004 || 
|-id=488
| 20488 Pic-du-Midi || 1999 OL || Observatoire du Pic-du-Midi. || 
|-id=491
| 20491 Ericstrege ||  || Eric William Strege, a DCYSC awardee in 2004 || 
|-id=495
| 20495 Rimavská Sobota ||  || Rimavská Sobota, a small town with a rich history, lies in the Rimava river valley. || 
|-id=496
| 20496 Jeník ||  || Jeník is the nickname of the main tenor character in Smetana's The Bartered Bride. || 
|-id=497
| 20497 Mařenka || 1999 RS || Marenka is the nickname of the main soprano character in Smetana's The Bartered Bride. || 
|-id=500
| 20500 Avner ||  || Lillian I. Avner (born 1952), Emergency Medicine Physician at Martin Memorial and Medical Director of Martin County Fire Rescue, dedicated her life to helping people. Lil's passion and leadership guided the ER and Fire Rescue from infancy to maturity. She contributed to thousands of lives saved through her decades of service. || 
|}

20501–20600 

|-id=503
| 20503 Adamtazi ||  || Adam Ryoma Tazi, a DCYSC awardee in 2004 || 
|-id=512
| 20512 Rothenberg ||  || Eckehard Rothenberg (born 1938), a German amateur astronomer and technical director of the Archenhold Observatory † ‡ || 
|-id=513
| 20513 Lazio ||  || Lazio is the Italian region containing Rome, the everlasting city. || 
|-id=517
| 20517 Judycrystal ||  || Judy Crystal (Andrews) Robinson (born 1949) is the wife of the discoverer. || 
|-id=518
| 20518 Rendtel ||  || Jürgen Rendtel (born 1954), a German solar physicist and amateur astronomer † ‡ || 
|-id=522
| 20522 Yogeshwar ||  || Ranga Yogeshwar (de) (born 1959), a physicist and scientific journalist. || 
|-id=524
| 20524 Bustersikes ||  || Leon R. Sikes III ("Buster", born 1959), is a Florida businessman and amateur astronomer. || 
|-id=526
| 20526 Bathompson ||  || Blake Alexander Thompson, a DCYSC awardee in 2004 || 
|-id=527
| 20527 Dajowestrich ||  || David John Westrich, a DCYSC awardee in 2004 || 
|-id=528
| 20528 Kyleyawn ||  || Kyle James Yawn, a DCYSC awardee in 2004 || 
|-id=529
| 20529 Zwerling ||  || Blake Gordon Zwerling, a DCYSC awardee in 2004 || 
|-id=530
| 20530 Johnayres ||  || John Ayres, mentor at the DCYSC in 2004 || 
|-id=531
| 20531 Stevebabcock ||  || Steven Babcock, mentor at the DCYSC in 2004 || 
|-id=532
| 20532 Benbilby ||  || R. Ben Bilby, mentor at the DCYSC in 2004 || 
|-id=533
| 20533 Irmabonham ||  || Irma Bonham, mentor at the DCYSC in 2004 || 
|-id=534
| 20534 Bozeman ||  || Melissa Bozeman, mentor at the DCYSC in 2004 || 
|-id=535
| 20535 Marshburrows ||  || Marsha Burrows, mentor at the DCYSC in 2004 || 
|-id=536
| 20536 Tracicarter ||  || Traci A. Carter, mentor at the DCYSC in 2004 || 
|-id=537
| 20537 Sandraderosa ||  || Sandra DeRosa, mentor at the DCYSC in 2004 || 
|-id=539
| 20539 Gadberry ||  || Sandra Gadberry, mentor at the DCYSC in 2004 || 
|-id=540
| 20540 Marhalpern ||  || Marcia Halpern, mentor at the DCYSC in 2004 || 
|-id=544
| 20544 Kimhansell ||  || Kim Hansell, mentor at the DCYSC in 2004 || 
|-id=545
| 20545 Karenhowell ||  || Karen Howell, mentor at the DCYSC in 2004 || 
|-id=553
| 20553 Donaldhowk ||  || Donald Howk, mentor at the DCYSC in 2004 || 
|-id=555
| 20555 Jennings ||  || Barbara Jennings, mentor at the DCYSC in 2004 || 
|-id=556
| 20556 Midgekimble ||  || Midge Kimble, mentor at the DCYSC in 2004 || 
|-id=557
| 20557 Davidkulka ||  || David Kulka, mentor at the DCYSC in 2004 || 
|-id=559
| 20559 Sheridanlamp ||  || Sheridan Lamp, mentor at the DCYSC in 2004 || 
|-id=564
| 20564 Michaellane ||  || Michael Lane, mentor at the DCYSC in 2004 || 
|-id=566
| 20566 Laurielee ||  || Laurie Lee, mentor at the DCYSC in 2004 || 
|-id=567
| 20567 McQuarrie ||  || Kerry Ann McQuarrie, mentor at the DCYSC in 2004 || 
|-id=568
| 20568 Migaki ||  || Janet Migaki, mentor at the DCYSC in 2004 || 
|-id=570
| 20570 Molchan ||  || Bonnie Molchan, mentor at the DCYSC in 2004 || 
|-id=571
| 20571 Tiamorrison ||  || Tiana Morrison, mentor at the DCYSC in 2004 || 
|-id=572
| 20572 Celemorrow ||  || Celeste Morrow, mentor at the DCYSC in 2004 || 
|-id=573
| 20573 Garynadler ||  || Gary Nadler, mentor at the DCYSC in 2004 || 
|-id=574
| 20574 Ochinero ||  || Marcia Collin Ochinero, mentor at the DCYSC in 2004 || 
|-id=576
| 20576 Marieoertle ||  || Marie Oertle, mentor at the DCYSC in 2004 || 
|-id=580
| 20580 Marilpeters ||  || Marilyn Peters, mentor at the DCYSC in 2004 || 
|-id=581
| 20581 Prendergast ||  || Dana Prendergast, mentor at the DCYSC in 2004 || 
|-id=582
| 20582 Reichenbach ||  || Edith Reichenbach, mentor at the DCYSC in 2004 || 
|-id=583
| 20583 Richthammer ||  || James Richthammer, mentor at the DCYSC in 2004 || 
|-id=584
| 20584 Brigidsavage ||  || Brigid Savage, mentor at the DCYSC in 2004 || 
|-id=585
| 20585 Wentworth ||  || Sandra Wentworth, mentor at the DCYSC in 2004 || 
|-id=586
| 20586 Elizkolod ||  || Elizabeth Kolod, an ISEF awardee in 2004 || 
|-id=587
| 20587 Jargoldman ||  || Jarett Goldman, an ISEF awardee in 2004 || 
|-id=589
| 20589 Hennyadmoni ||  || Henny Admoni, an ISEF awardee in 2004 || 
|-id=590
| 20590 Bongiovanni ||  || Brice Bongiovanni, an ISEF awardee in 2004 || 
|-id=591
| 20591 Sameergupta ||  || Sameer Gupta, an ISEF awardee in 2004 || 
|-id=593
| 20593 Freilich ||  || Janet Freilich, an ISEF awardee in 2004 || 
|-id=595
| 20595 Ryanwisnoski ||  || Ryan Wisnoski, an ISEF awardee in 2004 || 
|-id=600
| 20600 Danieltse ||  || Daniel Tse, an ISEF awardee in 2004 || 
|}

20601–20700 

|-id=604
| 20604 Vrishikpatil ||  || Vrishikumar Patil, an ISEF awardee in 2004 || 
|-id=606
| 20606 Widemann ||  || Thomas Widemann (born 1961), French planetary scientist at the Paris Observatory and associate professor at Versailles University || 
|-id=607
| 20607 Vernazza ||  || Pierre Vernazza (born 1979), planetary scientist at the European Space Agency's European Space Research and Technology Centre in Noordwijk || 
|-id=608
| 20608 Fredmerlin ||  || Frédéric Merlin (born 1981), French planetary scientist at the Observatoire de Paris || 
|-id=613
| 20613 Chibaken ||  || Chiba prefecture is located east of Tokyo. || 
|-id=616
| 20616 Zeeshansayed ||  || Zeeshan Sayed, an ISEF awardee in 2004 || 
|-id=618
| 20618 Daniebutler ||  || Danielle Butler, an ISEF awardee in 2004 || 
|-id=623
| 20623 Davidyoung ||  || David Young (born 1955), American amateur astronomer || 
|-id=624
| 20624 Dariozanetti ||  || Dario Zanetti (born 1959), Swiss artisan, who helped build the discovering Gnosca Observatory || 
|-id=625
| 20625 Noto ||  || The Noto Peninsula is located in Japan's geographical center, facing the Sea of Japan. || 
|-id=631
| 20631 Stefuller ||  || Stephen Fuller, an ISEF awardee in 2004  || 
|-id=632
| 20632 Carlyrosser ||  || Carly Rosser, an ISEF awardee in 2004 || 
|-id=634
| 20634 Marichardson ||  || Matthew Richardson, an ISEF awardee in 2004 || 
|-id=638
| 20638 Lingchen ||  || Ling Chen, an ISEF awardee in 2004 || 
|-id=639
| 20639 Michellouie ||  || Michelle Louie, an ISEF awardee in 2004 || 
|-id=641
| 20641 Yenuanchen ||  || Yen Uan-Chen, an ISEF awardee in 2004, and IFAA recipient † || 
|-id=642
| 20642 Laurajohnson ||  || Laura Johnson, an ISEF awardee in 2004 || 
|-id=643
| 20643 Angelicaliu ||  || Angelica Liu, an ISEF awardee in 2004 || 
|-id=644
| 20644 Amritdas ||  || Amrit Das, an ISEF awardee in 2004 || 
|-id=646
| 20646 Nikhilgupta ||  || Nikhil Gupta, an ISEF awardee in 2004 || 
|-id=649
| 20649 Miklenov ||  || Mikhail Klenov, an ISEF awardee in 2004 || 
|-id=657
| 20657 Alvarez-Candal ||  || Alvaro Alvarez-Candal, Argentinian planetary scientist at the Observatoire de Paris. || 
|-id=658
| 20658 Bushmarinov ||  || Ivan Bushmarinov, an ISEF awardee in 2004 || 
|-id=664
| 20664 Senec ||  || The town of Senec is located in the south-west of Slovakia. The historical development of the town is dated from the middle of the 13th century. Senec actively supports amateur astronomy. In 1982 an astronomical observatory was built on the building of Albert Molnár Szenczi Elementary School. || 
|-id=673
| 20673 Janelle || 1999 VW || Janelle Burgardt (born 1954), secretary and past president of the North East Kansas Amateur Astronomer's League. || 
|-id=686
| 20686 Thottumkara ||  || Arun Thottumkara, an ISEF awardee in 2004 || 
|-id=687
| 20687 Saletore ||  || Yogesh Saletore, an ISEF awardee in 2004 || 
|-id=689
| 20689 Zhuyuanchen ||  || Zhu Yuanchen, an ISEF awardee in 2004 || 
|-id=690
| 20690 Crivello ||  || Joseph Crivello, an ISEF awardee in 2004 || 
|-id=693
| 20693 Ramondiaz ||  || Jose Ramon Diaz Navarrete, an ISEF awardee in 2004 || 
|-id=696
| 20696 Torresduarte ||  || Luis Eduardo Torres Duarte, an ISEF awardee in 2004 || 
|}

20701–20800 

|-id=719
| 20719 Velasco ||  || Rodrigo Velasco Velasco, an ISEF awardee in 2004 || 
|-id=730
| 20730 Jorgecarvano ||  || Jorge Carvano (born 1971), Brazilian planetary scientist at the Rio de Janeiro National Observatory || 
|-id=731
| 20731 Mothédiniz ||  || Thais Mothé-Diniz (born 1974), Brazilian planetary scientist at the Rio de Janeiro National Observatory || 
|-id=740
| 20740 Sémery ||  || Alain Sémery (born 1944), French engineer at the Paris Observatory || 
|-id=741
| 20741 Jeanmichelreess ||  || Jean-Michel Reess (born 1967), French engineer at the Paris Observatory || 
|-id=760
| 20760 Chanmatchun ||  || Mat Chun Chan, the discoverer's mother || 
|-id=768
| 20768 Langberg ||  || Sarah Langberg, an ISEF awardee in 2004 || 
|-id=772
| 20772 Brittajones ||  || Britta Jones, an ISEF awardee in 2004 || 
|-id=773
| 20773 Aneeshvenkat ||  || Aneesh Venkat, an ISEF awardee in 2004 || 
|-id=776
| 20776 Juliekrugler ||  || Julie Krugler, an ISEF awardee in 2004 || 
|-id=778
| 20778 Wangchaohao ||  || Wang Chaohao, an ISEF awardee in 2004 || 
|-id=779
| 20779 Xiajunchao ||  || Xia Junchao, an ISEF awardee in 2004 || 
|-id=780
| 20780 Chanyikhei ||  || Chan Yik Hei (born 1989), an ISEF awardee in 2004 || 
|-id=782
| 20782 Markcroce ||  || Mark Croce, an ISEF awardee in 2004 || 
|-id=784
| 20784 Trevorpowers ||  || Trevor Powers, an ISEF awardee in 2004 || 
|-id=785
| 20785 Mitalithakor ||  || Mitali Thakor, an ISEF awardee in 2004 || 
|-id=787
| 20787 Mitchfourman ||  || Mitchell Fourman, an ISEF awardee in 2004 || 
|-id=789
| 20789 Hughgrant ||  || Hugh M. Grant (born 1933), Canadian amateur astronomer and a member of the Royal Astronomical Society of Canada || 
|-id=793
| 20793 Goldinaaron ||  || Aaron Goldin, an ISEF awardee in 2004 || 
|-id=794
| 20794 Ryanolson ||  || Ryan Olson, an ISEF awardee in 2004 || 
|-id=796
| 20796 Philipmunoz ||  || Philip Munoz, an ISEF awardee in 2004, and IFAA and EUCYSA recipient || 
|-id=798
| 20798 Verlinden ||  || Christopher Verlinden, an ISEF awardee in 2004, and IFAA and EUCYSA recipient || 
|-id=799
| 20799 Ashishbakshi ||  || Ashish Bakshi, an ISEF awardee in 2004 || 
|}

20801–20900 

|-id=804
| 20804 Etter ||  || Dolores M. Etter is renowned for lifetime achievement in digital signal processing and contributions to science education. || 
|-id=809
| 20809 Eshinjolly ||  || Eshin Jolly, an ISEF awardee in 2004 || 
|-id=812
| 20812 Shannonbabb ||  || Shannon Babb, an ISEF awardee in 2004 || 
|-id=813
| 20813 Aakashshah ||  || Aakash Shah, an ISEF awardee in 2004 || 
|-id=814
| 20814 Laurajones ||  || Laura Jones, an ISEF awardee in 2004 || 
|-id=817
| 20817 Liuxiaofeng ||  || Liu Xiaofeng, an ISEF awardee in 2004 || 
|-id=818
| 20818 Karmadiraju ||  || Kartik Madiraju, an ISEF awardee in 2004 || 
|-id=821
| 20821 Balasridhar ||  || Balaji Sridhar, an ISEF awardee in 2004 || 
|-id=822
| 20822 Lintingnien ||  || Lin Ting-Nien, an ISEF awardee in 2004 || 
|-id=823
| 20823 Liutingchun ||  || Liu Ting-Chun, an ISEF awardee in 2004 || 
|-id=828
| 20828 Linchen ||  || Lin Chen, an ISEF awardee in 2004 || 
|-id=830
| 20830 Luyajia ||  || Lu Yajia, an ISEF awardee in 2004, and IFAA recipient || 
|-id=831
| 20831 Zhangyi ||  || Yi-Chen "Lilly" Zhang, an ISEF awardee in 2004 || 
|-id=832
| 20832 Santhikodali ||  || Santhisri Kodali, an ISEF awardee in 2004 || 
|-id=834
| 20834 Allihewlett ||  || Allison Hewlett, an ISEF awardee in 2004 || 
|-id=835
| 20835 Eliseadcock ||  || Elise Adcock, an ISEF awardee in 2004 || 
|-id=836
| 20836 Marilytedja ||  || Marilynn Tedja, an ISEF awardee in 2004 || 
|-id=837
| 20837 Ramanlal ||  || Nimish Ramanlal, an ISEF awardee in 2004 || 
|-id=839
| 20839 Bretharrison ||  || Brett Harrison, an ISEF awardee in 2004 || 
|-id=840
| 20840 Borishanin ||  || Boris Hanin, an ISEF awardee in 2004 || 
|-id=843
| 20843 Kuotzuhao ||  || Kuo Tzu-Hao, an ISEF awardee in 2004 || 
|-id=846
| 20846 Liyulin ||  || Li Yu-Lin, an ISEF awardee in 2004 || 
|-id=850
| 20850 Gaglani ||  || Shiv Gaglani, an ISEF awardee in 2004 || 
|-id=851
| 20851 Ramachandran ||  || Reshma Ramachandran, an ISEF awardee in 2004 || 
|-id=852
| 20852 Allilandstrom ||  || Allison Landstrom, an ISEF awardee in 2004 || 
|-id=853
| 20853 Yunxiangchu ||  || Yun Xiang Chu, an ISEF awardee in 2004 || 
|-id=854
| 20854 Tetruashvily ||  || Mazell Tetruashvily, an ISEF awardee in 2004, and IFAA recipient || 
|-id=855
| 20855 Arifawan ||  || Arif Awan, an ISEF awardee in 2004 || 
|-id=856
| 20856 Hamzabari ||  || Hamza Bari, an ISEF awardee in 2004 || 
|-id=857
| 20857 Richardromeo ||  || Richard Romeo, an ISEF awardee in 2004 || 
|-id=858
| 20858 Cuirongfeng ||  || Cui Rongfeng, an ISEF awardee in 2004 || 
|-id=861
| 20861 Lesliebeh ||  || Leslie Beh, an ISEF awardee in 2004 || 
|-id=862
| 20862 Jenngoedhart ||  || Jennifer Goedhart, an ISEF awardee in 2004 || 
|-id=863
| 20863 Jamescronk ||  || James Cronk, an ISEF awardee in 2004 || 
|-id=870
| 20870 Kaningher ||  || Laura Kaningher, an ISEF awardee in 2004 || 
|-id=873
| 20873 Evanfrank ||  || Evan Frank, an ISEF awardee in 2004 || 
|-id=874
| 20874 MacGregor ||  || Meredith MacGregor, an ISEF awardee in 2004 || 
|-id=878
| 20878 Uwetreske ||  || Uwe Treske, an ISEF awardee in 2004, and IFAA, and Seaborg SIYSS Award recipient || 
|-id=879
| 20879 Chengyuhsuan ||  || Cheng Yu-hsuan, an ISEF awardee in 2004 || 
|-id=880
| 20880 Yiyideng ||  || Yiyi Deng, an ISEF awardee in 2004 || 
|-id=882
| 20882 Paulsánchez ||  || Diego Paul Sánchez Lana (born 1976) has applied the physics of granular mechanics to the study of rubble pile asteroids. His work has identified the possible source of asteroid cohesive strength and shown that it plays a fundamental role in the spin fission of asteroids and their pathways to binary asteroid formation. || 
|-id=883
| 20883 Gervais ||  || Raphaël Gervais, an ISEF awardee in 2004, and MILSET Expo-Science Europe Award recipient † ‡ || 
|-id=887
| 20887 Ngwaikin ||  || Ng Wai Kin (born 1974) is one of the pioneers in lunar and planetary imaging using webcam. || 
|-id=888
| 20888 Siyueguo ||  || Si Yue Guo, an ISEF awardee in 2004, and MILSET Expo-Science Europe Award recipient † || 
|-id=892
| 20892 MacChnoic ||  || Breandan Mac Chnoic, an ISEF awardee in 2004 || 
|-id=893
| 20893 Rosymccloskey ||  || Roisin McCloskey, an ISEF awardee in 2004 || 
|-id=894
| 20894 Krumeich ||  || Edwin Krumeich, an ISEF awardee in 2004 || 
|-id=896
| 20896 Tiphene ||  || Didier Tiphène (born 1957), French deputy director of the Laboratoire d'études spatiales et d'instrumentation en astrophysique at the Observatoire de Paris || 
|-id=897
| 20897 Deborahdomingue ||  || Deborah L. Domingue (born 1963), American planetary scientist at Johns Hopkins University Applied Physics Laboratory, who has worked on the NEAR space mission and is deputy project scientist for the MESSENGER mission || 
|-id=898
| 20898 Fountainhills ||  || Fountain Hills, Arizona, home of the Fountain Hills Observatory || 
|}

20901–21000 

|-
| 20901 Mattmuehler ||  || Matthew Muehler, an ISEF awardee in 2004 || 
|-id=902
| 20902 Kylebeighle ||  || Kyle Beighle, an ISEF awardee in 2004 || 
|-id=936
| 20936 Nemrut Dagi || 4835 T-1 || Nemrut Dagi, the volcano  in Turkey. || 
|-id=947
| 20947 Polyneikes || 2638 T-2 || Son of Oedipus, who was to alternate kingship over Thebes with his brother Eteokles. This led to the war of the Seven against Thebes. || 
|-id=952
| 20952 Tydeus || 5151 T-2 || Son of Oeneus, killed in the war of the Seven against Thebes || 
|-id=961
| 20961 Arkesilaos ||  || King Arkesilaos of Cyrene || 
|-id=962
| 20962 Michizane ||  || Sugawara no Michizane (845-903) was a noble, a scholar, a politician and a Kanshi poet. He is admired for his calligraphy, scholarship and poetry. || 
|-id=963
| 20963 Pisarenko ||  || Georgij Stepanovitsch Pisarenko, member of the International Academy of Culture † || 
|-id=964
| 20964 Mons Naklethi || 1977 UA || First known name of Mount Kleť, in the Czech Republic, where the discovering Kleť Observatory is located || 
|-id=965
| 20965 Kutafin ||  || Oleg Emel'yanovich Kutafin, Russian rector of the Moscow State Academy of Law || 
|-id=969
| 20969 Samo || 1979 SH || Samo, French merchant and founder of the first Bohemian state † ‡  || 
|-id=991
| 20991 Jánkollár ||  || Ján Kollár, Slovak poet, priest and diligent promoter of Slavic culture † || 
|-id=994
| 20994 Atreya || 1985 TS || Prakash Atreya (born 1985), a meteor astronomer and programming specialist at the Arecibo Observatory. || 
|-id=000
| 21000 L'Encyclopédie ||  || The Encyclopédie or Dictionnaire raisonné des sciences, des arts et des métiers (1751–1772), by Diderot and d´Alembert, may be considered the principal work of the Age of Enlightenment. || 
|}

References 

020001-021000